The 2007 Air New Zealand Screen Awards were held on Wednesday 1 August 2007 at SkyCity Theatre in Auckland, New Zealand. It was to be the final stand-alone NZ Screen Awards, as in 2008 the awards merged with the Qantas Television Awards and became the Qantas Film and Television Awards. 

Unlike previous years, the 2007 awards did not include a section for feature films, as the New Zealand Screen Director's Guild felt there had not been enough feature films released to "warrant a robust competition". Films produced in the 2007 eligibility period would be eligible for entry in the 2008 awards.

Nominees and Winners

There were 24 television categories (an decrease of six on 2006), two digital feature categories, four short film categories and no feature film categories.

Television 

Best Drama Programme 
 Karaoke High (eps 1 & 9), Debra Kelleher Outrageous Fortune (eps 7 & 16), South Pacific Pictures 
 Shortland Street (eps 3599 & 3642), South Pacific PicturesBest Comedy Programme 
 bro'Town (ep 3.2), Elizabeth Mitchell Moon TV (series 3, ep 1), Leigh Hart
 Wayne Anderson – Singer of Songs (ep 3), Glenn Elliott, Julia Parnell, Orlando Stewart, Jason PengellyBest Documentary 
 Love, Speed and Loss, Visionary Film & TV Touch Wood, Production Line
 Try Revolution, Leanne PooleyBest Factual Series Hunger for the Wild (eps 2 & 3), Peter Young, Tracy Roe Emergency (eps 2 & 7), Jenny Williams
 Hidden in the Numbers (eps 1 & 3), Mark McNeill, Dianne LindesayBest Mäori Language Programme 
 Waka Huia (Te Tau Whakamahara I a Tumatauenga), TVNZ Korero Ki Nga Kararehe (ep 5: Makimaki), Robert Pouwhare
 Waka Huia (Korowai o Te Aroha, part 3), TVNZBest Children's Programme 
 Maddigan's Quest (ep 8), South Pacific Pictures Let's Get Inventin' (ep 1: Rocket Skates), Neil Stichbury, Luke Nola
 The Killian Curse (series 1), Thomas Robins, Debra KelleherBest Lifestyle/Entertainment Programme 
 Dancing with the Stars (series 2, ep 8), Debra Kelleher Marae DIY, Screentime/Hula Haka Productions 
 The Living Room (series 3, ep 10), Mark Albiston, Sticky PicturesBest Event Broadcast 
 Na Ratou Mo Tatou – They Did It For Us, Screentime/Mäori Television Te Arikinui Dame Te Atairangikaahu – 1931–2006, Derek Te Kotuku Wooster
 Vodafone X-Air 2006 Post Event Shows (ep 3), Warren Green, Jason Naran, Sticky PicturesBest Sports Programme 
 Code (ep 32), Code/Mäori Television IRB Sevens World Series – Wellington, Stu Dennison, TVNZ Sport
 The Chosen Ones (ep 2: John Walker), Martin Crowe, Ian JohnBest Reality Series 
 Henderson To Hollywood (eps 8 & 9), Ondrej Havas Piha Rescue (series 3, ep 1), Eric Derks
 Tough Act (eps 1 & 5), Gibson GroupPerformance by an Actress 
 Robyn Malcolm, Outrageous Fortune (ep 16) Amanda Billing, Shortland Street (ep 3642)
 Rose McIver, Maddigan's Quest (ep 2)Performance by a Supporting Actress 
 Anna Jullienne, Shortland Street (ep 3566) Siobhan Marshall, Outrageous Fortune (ep 13)
 Antonia Prebble, Outrageous Fortune (ep 14)Performance by an Actor 
 Antony Starr, Outrageous Fortune (ep 7) Grant Bowler, Outrageous Fortune (ep 7)
 Jordan Metcalfe, Maddigan's Quest (ep 12)Performance by a Supporting Actor Frank Whitten, Outrageous Fortune (ep 13) Tammy Davis, Outrageous Fortune (ep 12)
 Will Wallace, Orange Roughies (ep 1)Presenter, Entertainment/Factual 
 Jason Gunn, Dancing with the Stars (series 2, ep 8) Joel Defries, Vodafone Select Live (ep 122)
 Te Radar, Hidden in the Numbers (ep 1)Script, Drama 
 James Griffin, Outrageous Fortune (Christmas special) Rachel Lang, Maddigan's Quest (ep 5)
 Rachel Lang, Outrageous Fortune (ep 16)Achievement in Directing, Drama/Comedy Programme 
 Simon Bennett, Outrageous Fortune (ep 16) Mark Beesley, Outrageous Fortune (ep 11)
 Michael Bennett, Outrageous Fortune (series 2, ep 7)Achievement in Directing, Documentary 
 Justin Pemberton, Love, Speed and Loss
 Mark Albiston, Artsville (ep 1: The Magical Word of Misery) 
 James Frankham, Pacific Solution

Achievement in Directing, Factual Programming/Entertainment 
 Rupert MacKenzie, Hidden in the Numbers (ep 2)
 Mark Albiston, The Living Room (series 3, ep 10)
 Peter Young, Hunger for the Wild

Achievement in Camerawork, Documentary 
 Peter Young, Country Calendar (ep 22: Cray Coast)
 James Ellis, Waka Reo (series 2)
 Simon Raby, Elgar's Enigma: Biography of a Concerto

Achievement in Editing Documentary 
 Bryan Shaw, Love, Speed and Loss
 John Fraser, Hidden In The Numbers (ep 3)
 Tim Woodhouse, Try Revolution

Achievement in Original Music 
 Victoria Kelly, Maddigan's Quest (ep 5)
 Joel Haines, Outrageous Fortune (ep 8)
 Dianne Swann, Brett Adams – The Bads, Hunger for the Wild

Contribution to a Soundtrack 
 Carl Smith, Rodney Larsen, Steve Finnigan, Maddigan's Quest (ep 2)
 Carl Smith, Steve Finnigan, Outrageous Fortune (ep 8)
 Beth Tredray, Hunger for the Wild

Contribution to Design 
 Tracey Collins, Maddigan's Quest (ep 1)
 Albedo VFX, Maddigan's Quest (ep 13)
 Katrina Hodge, Outrageous Fortune (ep 8)

Digital Feature 

Best Digital Feature 
 The Waimate Conspiracy, Stefen Lewis The Devil Dared Me To, Chris Stapp, Matt Heath, Karl Zohrab
 You Move You Die, Ketzal SterlingTechnical Contribution to a Digital Feature 
 Duncan Cole, The Last Magic Show
 Rhys Duncan, You Move You Die
 Georgie Hill, The Last Magic Show

Short film 

Best Short Film 
 Run, Mark Albiston 
 Fog, Rachel Gardner, Peter Salmon
 Hawaikii, Michael JonathanPerformance in a Short Film 
 Chelsie Preston Crayford, Fog
 Tyrrell Samia, Run
 Helayna Seiuli, Run

Script for a Short Film 
 Louis Sutherland, Run
 Miki Magasiva, Uso Brother
 Fiona Samuel, The Garden of Love

Technical Contribution to a Short Film 
 John Harding, The King Boys
 Simon Baumfield, Run
 Ginny Loane, Fog

References

New Zealand film awards
Film awards
New Zealand
Air New Zealand